is an urban expressway in Aichi Prefecture, Japan. It is a part of the Nagoya Expressway network and is owned and operated by Nagoya Expressway Public Corporation.

Overview

The route serves as an extension of Route 6, extending northward from its terminus at the Higashi-Meihan Expressway to the city of Ichinomiya. The entire route is built as an elevated expressway above the median of National Route 22 and links to the Meishin Expressway at Ichinomiya Interchange. The north-bound lanes terminate at Ichinomiya-higashi Interchange, while the south-bound lanes continue up to Ichinomiya-naka Entrance.

The route is 4 lanes for its entire length.

The toll is 350 yen for passenger cars and light trucks (including 2-wheeled vehicles). Tolls are collected at each north-bound exit and south-bound entrance. At Ichinomiya Interchange, payment for both the Nagoya Expressway and Meishin Expressway is made at the same toll booth.

Interchange list

 JCT - junction

References

External links
 Nagoya Expressway Public Corporation

Nagoya Expressway